Dudley Archives and Local History holds the archives for the town  of Dudley. The archives are held at Tipton Road, Dudley, and run by Dudley Metropolitan Borough Council.

The Archives and Local History Service looks after a collection that is housed in the purpose built Archives and Local History Centre in Dudley and includes records dating back to the 12th century.  They hold original archive material including business ledgers, local authority correspondence and minutes, maps and school records. The Archive contains over 15,000 books and pamphlets and around 26,000 images relating to the Dudley Metropolitan Borough.

References

County record offices in England
Dudley